Tivadar Csontváry Kosztka (5 July 1853 – 20 June 1919) was a Hungarian painter who was part of the avant-garde movement of the early twentieth century. Working mostly in Budapest, he was one of the first Hungarian painters to become  known in Europe. On 15 December 2006 the Kieselbach Gallery in Budapest sold an auction the most expensive Csontváry painting so far. The Rendezvous (1902) ("Meeting of the lovers") was bought by an anonymous client for more than one million EUR.

His works are held by the Hungarian National Gallery in Budapest and the Csontváry Museum in Pécs, among other institutions and private collectors.

Biography
Csontváry was born on 5 July 1853 in Kisszeben, Sáros County, Kingdom of Hungary (today Sabinov, Slovakia), and died 20 June 1919 in Budapest. His father, Dr. László Kosztka, was a physician and pharmacist, his mother was Franciska Hajczelmajer of Darócz (now Šarišské Dravce, Slovakia). His ancestors on his father's side were Poles who settled in Hungary. Although Csontváry was obsessed with his Magyar roots, he grew up speaking Slovak mixed with German. He was a pharmacist until his twenties.
 
On the hot sunny afternoon of 13 October 1880, when he was 27 years old, he had a mystic vision. He heard a voice saying, "You are going to be the greatest painter of the world, greater than Raphael." He took journeys around Europe, visited the galleries of the Vatican, and returned to Hungary to earn money for his journeys by working as an apothecary. From 1890, he traveled around the world. He visited Paris, the Mediterraneum (Dalmatia, Italy, Greece), North Africa and the Middle East (Lebanon, Palestine, Egypt, Syria) and painted pictures. Often his pictures are very large, several meters (yards) wide and height is not unusual.

He painted his major works between 1903 and 1909. He had some exhibitions in Paris (1907) and Western Europe. Most of the critics in Western Europe recognized his abilities, art and congeniality, but in the Kingdom of Hungary during his life, he was considered to be an eccentric crank for several reasons, e. g. for his vegetarianism, anti-alcoholism, anti-smoking, pacifism, and his cloudy, prophetic writings and pamphlets about his life (Curriculum), genius (The Authority, The Genius) and religious philosophy (The Positivum). Some of his biographists considered this as a latent, but increasingly disruptive schizophrenia. Although he was later acclaimed, during his lifetime Csontváry found little understanding for his visionary, expressionistic style. A loner by nature, his "failure" impaired his creative power.

He painted more than one hundred pictures, the most famous and emblematic of which is probably The Lonely Cedar (Magányos cédrus) . His art connects with post-impressionism and expressionism, but he was an autodidact and cannot be classified into one style. He identified as a "sunway"-painter, a term which he created.

Csontváry and mental disorder 
Csontváry is remembered as the “mad painter” in Hungary. Sources, including his own diary indicate that he had suffered from mental disorder at least from the time of his first auditory hallucination experienced at age 27. Many believe that his unique artistic style is a product of the his mental difficulties, although opinion is split as to what, if any mental disorder affected the Csontváry and whether that is reflected is his art.

Legacy

 
The Csontváry Museum in Pécs, Hungary, was founded in his honor and holds many of his works.

A quote 

"I, Tivadar Kosztka, who gave up his prime of youth for the rebirth of the world, accepting the call of the invisible Spirit, had a regular civil job, comfort, wealth then (...) Going to Paris in 1907 I oppositely stood alone in front of millions with only the result of the divine providence, and I beat the vanity of the world hollow, but I haven't killed 10 million people, only sobered them, I haven't made commercials from things, because I didn't care for the pedlar's press; I retired from the world instead, going to the top of the Lebanons, and I painted cedars."
 T., Cs. K.: The Positivum.

Gallery

References

Sources

Further reading 
Németh, Lajos. Csontváry. Budapest: Corvina, 1992. .

External links 

 An extremely high-res photo of painting Ruins of Greek Theatre at Taormina (courtesy of Hungarian National Gallery)
Csontváry Museum, Pécs (after first switching to English)
Fine Arts in Hungary
 Short biography
 
 Csontvary on the Oceanbidge
 Csontvary in Encyclopedia - Britannica Online Encyclopedia
 Csontváry Geniusz exhibition in Budapest, 2015

1853 births
1919 deaths
19th-century Hungarian painters
20th-century Hungarian painters
Burials at Kerepesi Cemetery
People from Sabinov
People with schizophrenia
Symbolist painters